The eighth series of the BBC family sitcom My Family originally aired between 11 April 2008 and 24 December 2008. The series was commissioned following consistent ratings from the seventh series. The opening episode, "The Parent Trap", re-introduces the seven main characters. All episodes from the eighth series are thirty minutes long, excluding the Christmas special. The series was once again produced by Rude Boy Productions, a company that produces comedies created by Fred Barron. The series was filmed at Pinewood Studios in London, in front of a live audience.

Episode Information

Reception

Viewers
Beginning with Series 8, My Family was given a much later slot, with most episodes airing at 9:30pm. The opening episode of the series gained only 5.56 million viewers, the poorest figure for an episode of the series yet. The eighth series averaged 5.39 million viewers for each episode.

References

External links
My Family: Series Eight at the British Comedy Guide
My Family: Series Eight at My Family Online
BBC Comedy- My Family Series 8

2008 British television seasons